Ekenberg or Eckenberg is a Swedish surname. Notable people with the surname include:

Barbara Ekenberg (1717–1799), Swedish businesswomen
Bengt Ekenberg (1912–1986), Swedish chess master
Marcus Ekenberg (born 1980), Swedish footballer
Roland Ekenberg (born 1957), Swedish Army major general
Rozyna Małgorzata von Eckenberg (1625–1648), Polish court official

See also

Swedish-language surnames